Rum is distilled in a wide variety of locations by a number of different producers. Below is a list of rum distillers and brands organized by location of the distiller.

Africa

Democratic Republic of Congo
Kwilu Rum

Kenya
Safari Rum

La Réunion

Riviere du Mat

Madagascar
Groupe Vidzar

Mauritius
New Grove
Penny Blue
Pink Pigeon
Saint-Aubin

Mozambique
Rhum Tipo Tinto

Seychelles
Takamaka

South Africa
Mainstay Original Premium
Man Up Rum 55% - (Navy style / Overproof Gold Craft rum)
MHOBA Rum
Whistler African Style Rum

Asia and the Pacific

Australia
Beenleigh
Brix Distillers
Bundaberg
Darby-Norris Distillery
Hoochery Distillery
Husk Distillers (Australian Agricole Rum)
Illegal Tender Rum Co.
Beenleigh
JimmyRum
Kimberley Rum Company
Nil Desperandum
Waterview Distillery

Cambodia
Samai Distillery

India
Old Monk
McDowell's No.1 Celebration
Amrut
Tilaknagar
Radico Khaitan

Japan
Suntory
 Nine Leaves
 Helios Distillery
 Kikusui Shuzo (Kochi)

Philippines
Bleeding Heart Rum Company
Tanduay

Nepal
Khukri Rum
Khukri Spice

New Zealand
Grenada Bay
Lunatic and Lover
LWF Distilling
The NZ Rum Co.

Taiwan
Taiwan Tobacco and Liquor Corporation

Thailand
Sang Som
Issan
Chalong Bay

Caribbean

Antigua and Barbuda
Cavalier
English Harbour

Bahamas
Luna Rum
John Watling's
Ole Nassau

Barbados
The Mount Gay Rum Distillery (owned by Remy Cointreau)
The West Indies Rum Distillery Ltd. (Goddard's Enterprises)
Bumbu Rum
Cockspur Rum
Malibu Rum
Foursquare Rum Distillery
St Nicholas Abbey

British Virgin Islands
Pusser's Ltd.

Cayman Islands
7 Fathoms
Edward Teach
Blackbeards
Tortuga

Cuba

Ron Cubay
Havana Club
Conde de Cuba
Ron Vigia
Ron Caney
Ron Arecha
Ron Edmundo Dantes
Ron Legendario
Ron Mulata
Ron Santiago de Cuba
Ron Varadero

Dominican Republic
Barceló
Bermúdez
Brugal
Matusalem
Siboney
Oliver
Macorix

Grenada
Clark's Court
Westerhall

Guadeloupe
Bielle
Damoiseau
Montebello
Père Labat
Séverin
Longueteau
Reimonenq
Bologne

Haiti
Rhum Barbancourt
Rhum Vieux Labbé
Rhum 1716

Jamaica
J. Wray and Nephew 
Appleton
Appleton Estate
Myers's
Rum-bar rum
The Rum Company
Old Pascas
Worthy Park
Hampden

Martinique
Habitation Saint-Etienne
J. Bally
La Mauny
Neisson
Rhum Clément
Rhum Dillon
Saint James
Trois Rivières

Puerto Rico

Bacardi
Don Q
Ron del Barrilito
Club Caribe Destillers

Saint Kitts and Nevis
Belmont Estate Rum
Cane Spirit Rothschild (no longer produced)

Saint Lucia
Chairman's Reserve Rum
Bounty Rum
Rum 1931
Rum Admiral Rodney
TOZ rum

Saint Vincent and the Grenadines
St. Vincent Distillers Ltd. (Sunset, Captain Bligh)

Sint Maarten
Topper's Rhum Distillery (Cole Bay, Sint Maarten)

Trinidad and Tobago
10 Cane (Moet Hennessy)
Angostura Rums (Angostura 1824, Angostura 1919, Old Oak, Royal Oak)
Fernandes Rums (Fernandes Black Label, Forres Park, Vat 19)
Island Company Rum
Kraken Rum (Proximo Spirits)

US Virgin Islands
There are two distilleries in the United States Virgin Islands Diageo subsidiary Captain Morgan and Beam Suntory subsidiary Virgin Islands Rum Industries, Inc. V.I.R.I. Inc. The two distilleries export in the form of intermodal tank containers at high proof and bottle elsewhere. V.I.R.I. Inc. has a proprietary brand Cruzan but produces a great variety of distributor brands.   
Captain Morgan (Diageo)
Cruzan (Beam Suntory Virgin Islands Rum Industries, Inc)
Sailor Jerry (William Grant & Sons)
Bones Rum (St. Thomas)
A.H. Riise (St. Thomas)

Central and South America

Argentina
Isla Ñ Rum

Belize
Travellers Liquors, Ltd. (One Barrel Rum)
L&R Liquors, Ltd.

Brazil
Oronoco Rum
Señor Weber Rum

Colombia
Parce
Dictador
Ron de Caldas
Ron Medellín
Ron Hechicera
Ron Santa Fé

Costa Rica
Centenario

El Salvador
Ron Cihuatán

Guatemala

Ron Botran
Ron Zacapa

Guyana
El Dorado
Pyrat Rum
Royal Rum

Honduras
Pirate's Grog Rum

Nicaragua
Flor de Caña
Ron Mombacho
Ron Zapatera

Panama
ARÔME Rum
1914 Edicion Gatun Rum
Cabeza de Vaca Rum
El Puro Rum
Don Esteban Rum
La Marelita Rum
Isla de Cañas by Don Pancho Rum
Comandante Overproof Rum
Portobelo Rum
Woldorff Private Cask Rum
La Cruz Vintage 1981 Rum
Isla de Coiba Rum
Yolo Rum
Contadora Rum
Canalero Rum
Casa Barú Rum
Duran Rum
Calicos Crew Rum
Carta Vieja Rum
Pacifico Rum
Pedro Mandinga Rum
Bohemio Rum
Malecon Rum
Ron de Jeremy Rum
Compañero Rum
Santa Rosa Rum
Panama Red Rum
Panama Pacific Rum
Cortez Rum
Naud Rum
Isla del Ron Panama Rum
Zahara Rum
Ron Panama Rum
Nativo Rum
Serum Rum
Kuna Rum
Colibri Artesanal Rum
El Artesano Rum
Grander Rum
Pacifico Rum
Moko Rum
Bandita Rum
El Legado Rum Elixir
Jumbie Rum
Caña Brava Rum
Offrian Rum
Panamonte Rum
Selva Rey Rum
Origenes Don Pancho
Origenes Maja
Origenes Guazapa
Ron Abuelo Varela Hermanos

Paraguay
Legado Organic Distillery
Jules Verne
Marianne de Paraguay
Papagayo

Peru
Cartavio
Ron Millonario

Suriname 
SAB Suriname Alcoholic Beverages N.V.

Venezuela
Cacique
Carúpano
Diplomático
Pampero
El Muco
Ocumare
Veroes
Dinastia
Ron Santa Teresa
Ron Roble Viejo
Barrica

Europe

Austria
Stroh – flavored rum

Czech Republic
Božkov Republica Exclusive

Denmark
A.H. Riise

France

Maison Ferrand (plantation line of Caribbean and Central American rums)
Drink Tank Ltd. – the producer of Tank Rum, distilled on the Réunion Island in the south Indian Ocean, thus Tank Rum is a "Product of France"
BOWS Distillery
Distillery O'Baptiste

Germany
Pott

The Netherlands
Zuidam
Rummieclub

Spain
Ron Montero
Arehucas

United Kingdom
Dead Man's Fingers

North America

Bermuda
Gosling Brothers

Canada
Newfoundland Screech
Ironworks Distillery
Nova Scotia Spirit Co. (Fisherman's Helper Rum)
Wayward Distillation House (Drunken Hive Rum)
Chic Choc

Mexico
Ron Bacardí
Ron Huasteco Potosí
Ron La Gloria
Ron Macollo
Ron Mocambo
Ron MK
Ron Prohibido

United States

Arizona
Desert Diamond Distillery home of Gold Miner Spirits (Kingman, AZ)
Grand Canyon Distillery (Williams, AZ)

California
California Spirits Co. (San Marcos, California)
Charbay Distillery (Napa/Mendecino, California)
Cutwater Spirits (San Diego, California)
Lost Spirits (Los Angeles, California)
Malahat Spirits (San Diego, California)
Old Harbor Distilling (San Diego, California)
Selvarey Rum (Hollywood, California)

Connecticut
Connecticut Valley Distillery (Ellington, Connecticut)

Delaware

Dogfish Head (Rehoboth, Delaware)

Florida
Black Coral Rum (West Palm Beach, Florida)
Chef Distilled (Key West, FL)
Hemingway Rum Company (Key West, Florida)
Rumcojones (St. Petersburg, Florida)
Siesta Key Rum (Sarasota, Florida)
 Alligator Bay Distillers (Punta Gorda, Florida)

Georgia
Richland Distilling Company (Richland, Georgia)

Hawaii
Kuleana Rum Works (Hawaii)
Koloa Rum (Hawaii)
Maui Dark Rum (Hawaii)

Indiana
Best Distillery (Elizabeth, Indiana)

Iowa
Artisan Grain Rum (Davenport, Iowa)

Louisiana
Jean Baptiste Rum (Broussard, Louisiana)
Three Roll Estate (Baton Rouge, Louisiana)
Bayou Rum (Lacassine, Louisiana)
Donner-Peltier Distillers (Thibodaux, Louisiana)
Old New Orleans Rum (New Orleans, Louisiana)

Maine
New England Distilling (Portland, Maine)
Bartlett Spirits of Maine (Gouldsboro, Maine)
Wiggly Bridge Distillery (York, Maine)
Maine Craft Distilling (Portland, Maine)

Maryland
Lyon Distilling Company (Saint Michaels, Maryland)
Seacrets Distilling Company (Ocean City, Maryland)

Massachusetts
Boston Harbor Distillery (Boston, Massachusetts)
Berkshire Mountain Distillers (Sheffield, Massachusetts)
Triple Eight Distillery (Nantucket, Massachusetts)
Bully Boy Distillers (Boston, Massachusetts)
GrandTen Distilling (Boston, Massachusetts)
Deacon Giles Distillery (Salem, Massachusetts)
Short Path Distillery (Everett, Massachusetts)
Rumson's (Salem, Massachusetts)
Privateer (Ipswich, Massachusetts)
South Hollow Spirits (Truro, Massachusetts)

Michigan
Ugly Dog Distillery (Chelsea, Michigan)

New Hampshire
Tall Ship Distillery (Dover, New Hampshire)

New Jersey
Cooper River Distillers (Camden, New Jersey)

New York
Van Brunt Stillhouse (New York, New York)
The Noble Experiment (New York, New York)

North Carolina
Broadslab Distillery (Benson, North Carolina)
Lassiter Distilling Company (Knightdale, North Carolina)
Muddy River Distillery (Belmont, North Carolina)
Outer Banks Distilling (Manteo, North Carolina)
Raleigh Rum Company (Raleigh, North Carolina)

Oregon
Rogue Spirits (Newport and Portland, Oregon)
Stillwagon Distillery (Charleston,  Oregon)

Pennsylvania
Big Springs Spirits (Bellefonte, Pennsylvania)
Bluebird Distilling (Phoenixville, Pennsylvania)
Maggie's Farm Rum (Pittsburgh, PA)
Manatawny Still Works (Pottstown, Pennsylvania)

Rhode Island
Coastal Extreme Brewing Company (Newport, Rhode Island)

South Carolina
Carolina Moon Distillery (Edgefield, South Carolina)
Copperhead Mountain Distillery (Travelers Rest, South Carolina)
Copper Horse Distilling (Columbia, South Carolina)
Daufuskie Island Rum Company (Daufuskie Island, South Carolina)
Firefly Distillery (Wadmalaw Island, South Carolina)
High Wire Distilling (Charleston, South Carolina)
JAKAL Distillery (Lexington, South Carolina)
Motte and Sons Bootlegging Co. (Spartanburg, South Carolina)
Striped Pig Distillery (North Charleston, South Carolina)

Tennessee
Prichard's Fine Rum (Kelso, Tennessee)

Texas
Railean Rum (San Leon, Texas)

Vermont
Dunc's Mill (St. Johnsbury, Vermont)
Mad River Distillers (Waitsfield, Vermont)

Rum brands present in several countries
Lamb's
Pyrat Rum
Rhum Plantation
Rum Nation
MHOBA Rum

References

Alcohol-related lists
Lists of drinks
Lists of brand name drinks
Lists of companies by industry

Distilled drinks